KLTK (1140 AM) is a radio station broadcasting a Regional Mexican radio format. Licensed to Centerton, Arkansas, United States, it serves the Fayetteville - Northwest Arkansas area. The station is currently owned by Edward Vega, through licensee La Zeta 957 Inc.

Programming is also heard on FM translator 99.9 K260CS in Rogers, Arkansas.

External links

News and talk radio stations in the United States
LTK
Radio stations established in 1972
LTK